Parc Hospital was a mental health facility at Bridgend in Wales.

History
Parc Gwyllt Farm and Gelliau Farm were identified in 1880 as forming a site suitable for the purposes of building an asylum. The hospital, which was designed by Giles, Gough and Trollope using a compact arrow layout, opened as the Second Glamorgan County Lunatic Asylum in 1886. It became Parc Gwyllt County Mental Hospital in the 1920s and joined the National Health Service as Parc Hospital in 1948.

After the introduction of Care in the Community in the early 1980s, the hospital went into a period of decline and closed in 1996. The hospital was subsequently demolished and the site redeveloped as Parc Prison in 1997. The old clocktower from Park Hospital has been restored and remains visible to the public on the Parc Prison site.

References

Further reading

Hospitals in Bridgend County Borough
Defunct hospitals in Wales
Hospital buildings completed in 1886
Hospitals established in 1886
1886 establishments in Wales
1996 disestablishments in Wales
Hospitals disestablished in 1996
Former psychiatric hospitals in Wales
Demolished buildings and structures in Wales
Buildings and structures demolished in 1997